Neurocomputing is a peer-reviewed scientific journal covering research on artificial intelligence, machine learning, and neural computation. It was established in 1989 and is published by Elsevier. The editor-in-chief is Zidong Wang (Brunel University London). Independent scientometric studies noted that despite being one of the most productive journals in the field, it has kept its reputation across the years intact and plays an important role in leading the research in the area. The journal is abstracted and indexed in Scopus and Science Citation Index Expanded. According to the Journal Citation Reports, its 2020 impact factor is 5.719.

References

External links

Neuroscience journals
Elsevier academic journals
Publications established in 1989
Computer science journals
Artificial intelligence publications
English-language journals